The Lagunienu is a small coastal stream in the southeast of the department of Corse-du-Sud, Corsica, France.

Course

It flows through the commune of Porto-Vecchio.
There are no named tributaries.
The stream rises to the northwest of the hamlet of Renajolo and flows in a generally southeast direction past the village of Palavesa to enter the Golfe de Porto-Vecchio between Poretta and Marina di Fiori.
There are east-facing beaches on either side of the mouth of the Lagunienu.

Notes

Sources

Rivers of Corse-du-Sud
Rivers of France
Coastal basins of the Tyrrhenian Sea in Corsica